Otoka may refer to:

 Bosanska Otoka, a village in the Federation of Bosnia and Herzegovina, Bosnia and Herzegovina
 Otoka, Krupa na Uni, a village in Republika Srpska, Bosnia and Herzegovina
 Otoka, Sarajevo, a neighbourhood of Novi Grad, Sarajevo, Bosnia and Herzegovina
 Otoka, Poland, a village in Gmina Łoniów, Świętokrzyskie Voivodeship, Poland